Chulpan (Sulpan) is a rural locality (a village) in Istyaksky Selsoviet, Yanaulsky District, Bashkortostan, Russia. The population was 56 as of 2010. There is 1 street.

Geography 
Chulpan is located 16 km northeast of Yanaul (the district's administrative centre) by road. Stary Kuyuk is the nearest rural locality.

References 

Rural localities in Yanaulsky District